Kiran Bala Govil ( Sachdev; 9 July 1944 – 18 November 2022), known professionally as Tabassum, was an Indian actress, talk show host and YouTuber, who started her career as child actor Baby Tabassum in 1947. She later had a television career as the host of first TV talk show of Indian television, Phool Khile Hain Gulshan Gulshan. It ran on National broadcaster Doordarshan from 1972 to 1993, wherein she interviewed film and TV personalities.

Early life and background
Tabassum was born in Mumbai, then known as Bombay, in 1944 to Ayodhyanath Sachdev, an Indian freedom fighter, and Asghari Begum, a freedom fighter, journalist and author. She explained how she was named in an interview in 2014:
My father named me 'Tabassum', keeping my mother's religious sentiments in mind. My mother kept my name 'Kiran Bala', keeping my father's religious sentiments in mind. My name on all official documents was 'Kiran Bala Sachdev'. After marriage, it became 'Kiran Bala Govil'. 'Tabassum' is my screen name; it means muskhurahat (smile).

Career

Tabassum made her film debut as a child actor with Nargis (1947) followed by Mera Suhaag (1947), Manjhdhar (1947) and Bari Behen (1949). Later in Deedar (1951), directed by Nitin Bose, she played the childhood role of Nargis; the hit song Bachpan Ke Din Bhula Na Dena sung by Lata Mangeshkar and Shamshad Begum was picturised on her. Also, in the next year, she appeared in another important film Baiju Bawra (1952) directed by Vijay Bhatt, where she appeared in the childhood role of Meena Kumari. She also worked in the popular film Phir Wohi Dil Laya Hoon starring Joy Mukherjee and Asha Parekh. She also starred in the beautiful song 'Aji qibla mohtarma'. After a gap, she reentered films in adult roles, working as a character actress.

Tabassum hosted the first talk show of Indian television, Phool Khile Hain Gulshan Gulshan, which ran for 21 years from 1972 to 1993. Produced by Doordarshan Kendra Mumbai, it was based on interviews of film celebrities and became immensely popular. This also led to a career as stage compere. She was also the editor of Grihalaxmi, a Hindi women's magazine for 15 years and wrote many joke books.

In 1985, she directed, produced and wrote her first film, Tum Par Hum Qurban. In 2006, she returned to television, as an actress in Pyaar Ke Do Naam: Ek Raadha, Ek Shyaam, produced by Rajshri Productions. She became a judge in a reality stand-up comedy show Ladies Special (2009) on Zee TV.

Tabassum continued to work as an interviewer for television and was doing a TV show on TV Asia USA and Canada titled Abhi Toh Main Jawaan Hoon based on the Golden Era of Hindi Cinema. In 2016, she launched her channel on YouTube, titled "Tabassum Talkies" which consists of nostalgic talks, interviews of celebrities, shayaris, jokes and more. Subsequently she returned to television with "Tab Aur Ab" in 2020.

Personal life
Tabassum was married to Vijay Govil, elder brother of television actor Arun Govil. Their son Hoshang Govil had brief career as a lead in three films  Tum Par Hum Qurbaan (1985), which was produced and directed by Tabassum and introduced Johnny Lever for the first time on screen as a comedian, Kartoot (1987) and Ajeeb Dastaan Hai Yeah (1996) produced by Zee TV and directed by J Om Prakash (grandfather of Hrithik Roshan). In 2009, her granddaughter Khushi (daughter of Hoshang) made her film debut with Hum Phir Mile Na Mile.

Death and tributes
Tabassum suffered from gastrointestinal issues in her last days. She was admitted in hospital but passed away on 18 November 2022, after suffering two successive cardiac arrests. She was 78.
Various celebrities including Amitabh Bachchan, Twinkle Khanna, Adnan Sami, Asha Parekh, Waheeda Rehman, Deepti Naval and others condoled her death. Milk brand Amul gave Tabassum a tribute with a special doodle.

Filmography
Source(s):

Films

 Nargis (1947)
 Mera Suhaag (1947)
 Manjhdhar (1947)
 Bari Behen (1949) as Munni
 Chhoti Bhabhi (1950)
 Sargam (1950)
 Sangram (1950)
 Jogan (1950) as Mangu 
 Gumashta (1951)
Aaram (1951)
 Deedar (1951)
 Bahar (1951)
 Afsana (1951) as Young Meera
 Baiju Bawra (1952) Young Gauri
 Baap Beti (1954)
 College Girl (1960)
 Mughal-e-Azam (1960)
 Dharmputra (1961) as Rekha Rai 
 Phir Wohi Dil Laya Hoon (1963)
 Dara Singh: Ironman (1964)
 Zimbo Ka Beta (1966)
 Ganwaar (1970) as Mistress
 Bachpan (1970) as Lily – Tom's wife
 Heer Raanjha (1970) 
 Johny Mera Naam (1970)
 Shri Krishna Leela (1971) as Rasili
 Shree Krishnarjun Yuddh (1971) as Chitrangini
 Ladki Pasand Hai (1971) 
 Gambler (1971)
 Adhikar (1971)
 Tere Mere Sapne (1971) as Maltimala's Hairdresser
 Shaadi Ke Baad (1972) as Basanti
 Maa Bahen Aur Biwi (1974)
 Sur Sangam (1985)
 Naache Mayuri (1986)
 Chameli Ki Shaadi (1986)
 Swarg (1990) as Herself

Television
Source(s): 

 Phool Khile Hain Gulshan Gulshan (1972 - 1993, Doordarshan)
 Pyaar Ke Do Naam: Ek Raadha, Ek Shyaam (2006, STAR Plus) as Kishan's grandmother
 Ladies Special (2009, Zee TV) as Herself (Judge)
 Tab Aur Ab (2020, Tata Play)

Web

 Tabassum Talkies (2016 - 2022, YouTube)

References

External links
 Tabassum's Youtube Channel
 
 

1944 births
2022 deaths
Indian film actresses
Actresses in Hindi cinema
Indian women television presenters
20th-century Indian actresses
Indian television actresses
Indian television talk show hosts
Masters of ceremonies
Indian magazine editors
Indian comedy writers
Indian women comedians
Actresses from Mumbai
Indian child actresses
Indian women television journalists
Indian television journalists
20th-century Indian journalists
21st-century Indian journalists
21st-century Indian women writers
21st-century Indian writers
Writers from Mumbai
Women writers from Maharashtra
Actresses in Hindi television
20th-century Indian women writers
Women magazine editors